Danio catenatus  is a species of Danio found in the Thandwe Chaung River drainage in Myanmar.

References

Danio
Fish described in 2015